Pegae or Pegai, also known as Crenides or Krenides (Κρενίδες), both words meaning springs in Greek, was a town of ancient Thrace, near Byzantium. Nearby was fought the Battle of Pegae in March of 921.

The site of Pegae is near the modern Kasımpaşa, in European Turkey.

References

Populated places in ancient Thrace
Former populated places in Turkey